Ptychobarbus dipogon is a species of cyprinid of the genus Ptychobarbus. It is used for food locally and is considered harmless to humans. It has been assessed as "least concern" on the IUCN Red List.

References

Cyprinid fish of Asia
Freshwater fish of China
IUCN Red List least concern species